Anthony Wencel Chez (January 12, 1872 – December 30, 1937) was an American football, basketball, and baseball coach and college athletics administrator. He served as the head football coach at Wabash College (1900), DePauw University (1901), the University of Cincinnati (1902–1903), and West Virginia University (1904), compiling a career college football record of 24–20–2. Chez was also the head basketball coach at Cincinnati (1902–1904) and West Virginia (1904–1907), amassing a career college basketball record of 27–31. In addition, he was the head baseball coach at Wabash in 1901 and Cincinnati from 1903 to 1904, tallying a career college baseball mark of 20–16–2. From 1904 to 1913 Chez served as West Virginia's athletic director.

Coaching career
Chez was the 13th head football coach at the Wabash College located in Crawfordsville, Indiana and he held that position for the 1900 season. His record at Wabash was 5–4. In 1901, he became head football coach at rival DePauw University, where he led the Tigers to an 8–3 season, including two big wins (32–2, 35–5) over his former employer to the north, Wabash. From 1902 to 1903, he served as the head football coach at the University of Cincinnati, where he compiled a 5–10–2 record. In 1904, he was the head football coach at West Virginia University, where he compiled a 6–3 record.

Head coaching record

Football

Basketball

References

1872 births
1937 deaths
19th-century players of American football
Cincinnati Bearcats baseball coaches
Cincinnati Bearcats football coaches
Cincinnati Bearcats men's basketball coaches
DePauw Tigers football coaches
Oberlin Yeomen football players
Wabash Little Giants baseball coaches
Wabash Little Giants football coaches
West Virginia Mountaineers athletic directors
West Virginia Mountaineers football coaches
West Virginia Mountaineers men's basketball coaches